Williston is a census-designated place (CDP) in the town of St. George, Chittenden County, Vermont, United States. It was first listed as a CDP prior to the 2020 census.

The CDP is in south-central Chittenden County, in the southwest corner of the town of St. George, centered on the intersection of Vermont Route 116 and Vermont Route 2A (St. George Road). It is bordered to the west by the town of Shelburne and to the south by the town of Hinesburg. VT 116 leads northwest  to South Burlington and south-southeast  to Hinesburg village, while VT 2A leads north  to Williston.

References 

Populated places in Chittenden County, Vermont
Census-designated places in Chittenden County, Vermont
Census-designated places in Vermont